Love You, is a 2011 Taiwanese drama starring Joseph Chang, Rainie Yang, Kingone Wang, Ann Hsu, Alien Huang and Thomas Price. It is the second installment of the Fated to Love You trilogy. It started filming in January 2011 and wrapped on 30 April.

It was first broadcast in Taiwan on free-to-air Taiwan Television (TTV) from 17 April 2011, every Sunday at 22:00 and cable TV SET Metro from 23 April 2011, every Saturday at 21:00.

Love You was nominated for four awards at the 46th Golden Bell Awards, including Best Actor for Joseph Chang, Best Director in a Television Series for Chen Ming-chang and Best Television Series.

Synopsis
Two strangers, both proposed marriage to their respective girl/boyfriend, were rejected on the same day. They decided that the best way to deal with the rejection was to get drunk, really drunk. During the 24 hours of their crazy drunkenness, these two stranger became fast friends and married each other. When they finally sobered up, they embarked on a mission to undo every crazy thing they did while they were drunk and prayed that their girl/boyfriend wouldn't find out. However, it turns out that Jie Xiu's girlfriend, Ai Wei, doesn't want a scandal affecting her movie so she asks him to stay married to Xiao Ru for three months. Jie Xiu and Xiao Ru eventually develop feelings for each other, and Ai Wei tries to prevent their relationship from progressing. Ai Wei becomes jealous and realises how much she loves Jie Xiu, revealing the fake marriage contract to the media hoping that will make them get back together. Soon she realises that she is too late and she cannot stop their love for each other.

Jie Xiu's mother Samantha catches trouble at a club, but they sort it out and Jie Xiu's relationship with his mother strengthens. During a celebration at the Farglory Hotel, though, Samantha ends up in the hospital after falling down the stairs. Xiao Ru's childhood friend and the franchise owner (Shuo Huai) comes back in hopes of marrying her, and in an emotional crossroads, he almost takes her back to America with him. Xiao Ru finally sorts herself out, after a long time of thinking she was "taking something that belonged to someone else". She decided that she wasn't stealing Jie Xiu from Ai Wei, and ultimately the two decide to divorce - for their fake marriage - and then marry again for real.

Cast

Multimedia

Original soundtrack
 Opening theme: "不按牌理出牌" (Unplanned) by Magic Power
 Ending theme: "好的事情" (Good Things) by Yen-j

Books
 Love You (Novel) (醉後決定愛上你原創小說) –  – released 17 June 2011

Reception

Rival dramas on air at the same time:
 CTV Main Channel (CTV) (中視): Sunny Happiness (幸福最晴天) / Love Keeps Going (美樂。加油)
 CTS Main Channel (CTS) (華視): They Are Flying (飛行少年)
 FTV Free-to-air Channel (FTV) (民視): Together for Love (愛讓我們在一起) / Hayate the Combat Butler (旋風管家)

International broadcast
 Singapore – Starhub TV E City, premiered on 26 June 2011, Sundays at 20:00
 Singapore (Free to air) – MediaCorp Channel U, premiered on 4 June 2012, Monday–Friday at 22:00 
 Japan – DATV, 12 September 2011 – 9 April 2012 Monday at 11:00pm
 Philippines – GMA Network, (28, November 2011 – 17 February 2012) Monday–Friday at 5:00pm
 South Korea – KBS 1TV 31 March 2012 Saturday at 23:30–00:05
 Vietnam - VTV6 6 October 2012 Monday–Sunday at 10:10pm
 Indonesia – B Channel, 14 October 2013 Monday–Friday at 11:30am–12:30pm

Awards and nominations

References

External links
 TTV Love You official homepage
 SETTV Love You official blog

Taiwanese drama television series
Taiwan Television original programming
2011 Taiwanese television series debuts
2011 Taiwanese television series endings
Taiwanese romance television series
Sanlih E-Television original programming